There were three automobiles called Pilot in the brass car and vintage car eras.  An American Pilot was built from 1909 to 1924 in Richmond, Indiana.   A British Pilot was built from 1909 to 1914 in London, England and a German Pilot built from 1923 to 1925 in Werdau, Saxony.

American automobile

The Pilot Motor Car Company of Richmond, Indiana, was headed by George Seidel, of the Seidel Buggy Company.  Initially, the cars were built in the Seidel Buggy factory while a stand-alone factory was constructed across town.  It has been said that the cars were named Pilot because Seidel had wanted to become a river boat pilot.  Pilots were assembled cars that were not particularly innovative.  Nonetheless, their advertising slogan was "The Car Ahead", doubtless because of the name of the car.  The new factory had a capacity of 500 cars per year, though in some later years, production approached 1,000.  The firm was one of the first in the automotive field to hire women, though mainly for upholstery and curtain work.

At first, 4-cylinder Teetor-Hartley engines were the motive force of the cars.  In 1913, a 6-cylinder engine was added to the line-up.  From 1915 to 1924, only six-cylinders were offered, except for 1916, when a V8 engine made a one-year appearance as an engine choice.  In 1913, the six-cylinder car cost $2,500, as opposed to the mid-priced $1,500 to$1,800  four-cylinder cars.  In 1920, a larger Herschell-Spillman six was added.  A Sportster model was introduced in the summer of 1922 and was the most dashing car from the firm, with barrel headlights and no running boards.

The firm took over the local Lorraine, but that could not help it survive long beyond the 1920-21 depression.  A few Lorraine hearses were produced before that marque was discontinued.  The Pilot Motor Car Company was forced into receivership in 1923 by what George Seidel described as "cut-throat tactics of Eastern money interests."  The last Pilots were produced in early 1924, and the factory was then sold to a local businessman for $28,500.

Pilots were durable cars, and was regularly exported. George Seidel received a letter in the 1940s from a car dealer in South America, who inquired if any Pilots were still available, and their price.  George Seidel was proud of his hometown, as evidenced by the cars he drove: first, a Richmond; then a Pilot (obviously); and finally, a Davis.

Advertisements

British automobile
The company who created this Pilot car started out as a driving and maintenance school.  In 1909, they displayed a car with a 4-cylinder White and Poppe engine of 16 hp.  The following year they displayed another 4-cylinder car, this one with a Hillman engine and belt and cone-pulley drive. Both of these were probably the only cars produced with these specifications.  In 1911, the parent company was reformed as Pilot Works and Friction Cars, Ltd to produce a smaller car.  This one had a Coventry-Simplex single-cylinder engine of only 7 hp, in addition to friction drive.  In 1912-1914, yet another engine was employed in their cars—a Chapuis-Dornier 4-cylinder of 10 hp.  This car also used friction drive.  This appears to be the last car produced.

German automobile
This Pilot light car used a 6/30PS 4-cylinder engine.  Soon after the car debuted, the firm was bought by a rail carriage-maker, Sächsische Waggonfabrik.  Production was thereafter carried out in the new firm's factory in Werdau.  In addition to both open and closed cars, a delivery van was also produced for the short time the marque was in existence.  Due to the poor economic conditions in Germany at the time, the firm soon dropped automobiles altogether to concentrate on rail production.

References

See also

 1917 Pilot Model 6-45 at ConceptCarz
 1922 Pilot Speedster restored by Wayne County Historical Museum

Defunct motor vehicle manufacturers of the United Kingdom
Defunct motor vehicle manufacturers of the United States
Defunct motor vehicle manufacturers of Germany
Motor vehicle manufacturers based in Indiana
1910s cars
1920s cars
Brass Era vehicles
Vintage vehicles
Cars introduced in 1909
Vehicle manufacturing companies established in 1909
Vehicle manufacturing companies disestablished in 1924